Journal of Food Protection is a scientific journal that covers original research in food science. The journal is published by Elsevier.

Abstracting and indexing 
The journal is abstracted and indexed for example in:

 Scopus
 Science Citation Index
 PubMed/Medline

According to the Journal Citation Reports, the journal has a 2021 impact factor of 2.745.

References

External links 

 

Food science journals
Elsevier academic journals
English-language journals